Friesoythe, in Saterland Frisian language Ait or Äit, is a town in the district of Cloppenburg, Lower Saxony, Germany, on the river Soeste,  northwest of Cloppenburg, and  southwest of Oldenburg.

History
In 1227, Count Otto von Tecklenburg made Oite Castle in Friesoythe, which had just been built, his residence.  Farmers, merchants and craftsmen quickly settled near the castle.  As early as the first half of the 13th century, Friesoythe had extensive trade relations, as evidenced by the coin find from Friesoythe, whose more than 300 silver coins from Cologne, Münster, Osnabrück and other cities were only in circulation until 1235. Today's city center was soon surrounded by a massive city wall and was long considered impregnable.  1308 Friesoythe was first mentioned as a town.  Friesoythe is occasionally referred to as a "Hanseatic town" and is said to have enjoyed Hanseatic privileges.  It is unclear whether Friesoythe actually belonged to the Hanseatic League.

Friesoythe shares a diverse culture in Lower Saxony history. Many cultural influences of German, Anglo-Saxon, Dutch, East Frisian, Danish and Swedish culture are noticeable in the town and citizens. The town has a large following of Roman Catholicism and small percentages of Calvinism and Lutheranism. It was part of the Duchy of Oldenburg and also under rule to the French Empire in the 18th century.

Second World War 

In April 1945, the town of Friesoythe was evacuated and then occupied by the 4th Canadian (Armoured) Division, under General Christopher Vokes. Most of the town's population of 4,000 had moved out to the surrounding countryside on about April 11–12, 1945.

The town was defended by some 200 paratroopers of Battalion Raabe of the 7th German Parachute Division.  These paratroopers repelled the first attack by the Lake Superior Regiment (Motor) on April 13. The Lake Superior Regiment suffered two dead and nineteen wounded. German casualties are not known.

Vokes ordered the resumption of the attack the next day by The Argyll and Sutherland Highlanders of Canada (Princess Louise's) commanded by Lieutenant Colonel Frederick E. Wigle. The attack went well, with the Argylls securing the town by 10:30 hours. However, at 08:30 a small number of German soldiers caught Wigle's tactical headquarters by surprise, killing Wigle and several other soldiers. Lieutenant Alan Earp survived a bullet through the head.

Vokes ordered an immediate reprisal. "A first-rate officer of mine, for whom I had a special regard and affection, and in whom I had a particular professional interest because of his talent for command, was killed. Not merely killed, it was reported to me, but sniped in the back". According to Vokes, "I summoned my GSO1 . . 'Mac,' I roared at him, 'I'm going to raze that goddam town.'"

Units and soldiers of the Argylls had spontaneously begun burning buildings in Friesoythe as revenge for the death of their colonel, but Vokes later issued a direct order, and the town was systematically set on fire with flamethrowers mounted on Wasp Carriers. The rubble was used to reinforce district roads for the division's tanks. According to German estimates, 85% to 90% of the town was destroyed, making it one of the most devastated towns in Germany at the time. Vokes commented that he had "No feeling of remorse over the elimination of Friesoythe." The Argyll and Sutherland Highlanders and the Lake Superior Regiment (Motor) were awarded the battle honour "Friesoythe".

21st century 
Friesoythe has grown from a village to a small city and shares traditional and modern style  buildings of German architecture, Bauhaus, Victorian style, Renaissance and Baroque style. Large multinational companies are settled giving the city a modern appearance and lively feeling. Hospital, schooling, bus service, health service are all available in the city centre. The city has good communication and infrastructure and many American Germans, Poles and Russians integrated into its population.

Mayors 
 Gerhard Wreesmann: 7 April 1945 – 2 February 1946
 Heinrich Vogel: 1946–1948
 Heinz Stuke: 1948–1953
 Gerhard Block: 1953 – 28 July 1967
 Heinrich Olberding: 20 Oxtober 1967 – 1 October 1972
 Ferdinand Cloppenburg: 14 November 1972 – 2 March 1984
 Heinrich Niehaus:	11 April 1984 – 14 November 1996
 Johann Wimberg: 15 November 1996 – 31. October 2014
 Sven Stratmann: 1 November 2014

Notable people
 Wilhelm Abeln (1894–1969), farmer and politician, member of Oldenburg Landtag
 Monika Hilker (born 1959), biologist
 Franz-Josef Holzenkamp (born 1969), politician (CDU)
 Heinrich Totting von Oyta (c. 1330–1397), theologian and philosopher, co-founder of the Catholic Faculty of Theology of the University of Vienna

References

Bibliography 
 G. L. Cassidy, Warpath; the Story of the Algonquin Regiment, 1939–1945. Toronto: Ryerson Press, 1948.
 Ferdinand Cloppenburg, Die Stadt Friesoythe im zwanzigsten Jahrhundert. Friesoythe: Cloppenburg, 2003.  Limited to 1,000 copies.
 Tony Foster, Meeting of Generals. Toronto; New York: Methuen, c1986.
 Robert L. Fraser, ed. Black Yesterdays; the Argylls' War. Hamilton, ON: Argyll Regimental Foundation, 1996. A work of 608 pp., numerous photographs, many illustrations, (some col.) limited to 1,000 copies.  A lavish, massive, even monumental history of the Canadian Argylls during World War II and a model of its kind.
 Friesoythe 25 Jahre danach: 1945-1970. Friesoythe: Stadt Friesoythe, 1970.
 Landkreis Emsland. Wege aus dem Chaos; Das Emsland und Niedersachsen 1945-1949. Begleitbuch zur Ausstellung. 2. Aufl. Hrsg. vom Landkreis Emsland. Meppen: 1988.
 C. P. Stacey, A Date with History; Memoirs of a Canadian Historian. Ottawa, ON: Deneau, c1983?
 C. P. Stacey, Official History of the Canadian Army in the Second World War. Vol. III. The Victory Campaign; the Operation in North-West Europe, 1944–1945. Ottawa: Queen's Printer, 1960.
 Chris Vokes, Vokes, My Story. By Major General Chris Vokes with John P. Maclean. Memorial Edition. Ottawa, ON: Gallery Books, 1985.
 War Diary, Argyll and Sutherland Highlanders of Canada, April 14, 1945, pp. 10–11. Ottawa, ON, Canada. National Archives of Canada, RG 24, v. 15,005
 War Diary, 1st Battalion, The Lake Superior Regiment (Motor), April 12, 1945, sheet 15. Ottawa, ON, Canada. National Archives of Canada, RG 24, Vol. 15,099.
 War Diary, General Staff, 4th Canadian Armoured Division, April 14, 1945, p. 15. Ottawa, ON, Canada. National Archives of Canada, RG 24, no. 13,794.
 August Wöhrmann, "Die Kämpfe 1945 in und um Friesoythe," IN Friesoythe 25 Jahre danach: 1945-1970 (Friesoythe: Stadt Friesoythe, 1970) 8-29. Wöhrmann was the first to make a serious examination of the issue, and this work is a ground-breaking study of great value which identifies many of the relevant sources.  Unfortunately Wöhrmann, a former soldier  himself, reports he was unable to make any contact with the German paratroopers who defended Friesoythe.

External links 

  

Cloppenburg (district)
Grand Duchy of Oldenburg
Populated places established in the 1220s